Paul Clayton (born 8 March 1957) is an English actor, director and author.

Career
Clayton played Ian Chapman in award-winning Channel 4 sitcom Peep Show. for five series. In 2011, Clayton portrayed Sam Foster, father of Frank Foster in Coronation Street. Clayton also appears in the BBC Three sitcom Him & Her where he plays Graham. In 2013 and 2014, he played Superintendent Marlow in Hollyoaks, until his character was murdered on 21 April.

Clayton has made other notable television appearances in Doctor Who, My Family, Doctors and Wire in the Blood, as well as films such as Ali G Indahouse. He also features in the British crime thriller The Rise.

Clayton filmed "Danny Boy" for Expectation films in November 2020. He appeared in the film Greed released in February 2020 and in Sky One original Breeders He also appears in  an episode of Cursed for Netflix as Ladislas. He has also directed  Joe Orton's The Ruffian on the Stair at The Hope Theatre in January 2019 featuring Lucy Benjamin, Gary Webster and Adam Buchanan. Clayton was seen in "Outrageous Fortune", the opening episode of Series two of Shakespeare & Hathaway, alongside Alan Partridge in This Time With Alan Partridge, and in the acclaimed Black Earth Rising. He also appeared in season 2 of The Crown on Netflix as Bob Boothby. He also filmed Delicious with Dawn French for Sky 1.  Clayton made his first stage appearance for ten years in Brimstone and Treacle at the Hope Theatre in 2017 for which he was nominated for an Off West End award for Best Actor. In May 2018, Clayton appeared in major roles in Holby City and The Split on BBC One.  He also shot the short horror picture Service directed by Theo Watkins.

Clayton plays Mr Colchester in Torchwood for Big Finish Productions.

In 2021 Clayton recorded "The Red List," a new adventure for Big Finish. 

On stage, Clayton was a member of the Royal Shakespeare Company where he appeared alongside actors including Judi Dench and Zoe Wanamaker.  In the  West End, Clayton played the leading role of Tony in the improvised comedy whodunnit Scissor Happy at the Duchess Theatre  alongside The Comedy Store Players.

Clayton's directing credits include Privates on Parade at the Greenwich Theatre, starring Tony Slattery, The Comedy of Errors at Nottingham Playhouse starring Robert Bathurst, Paula Wilcox and Janet Dibley, The Pocket Dream at York Theatre Royal starring Lucy Benjamin and seven productions at the Watermill Theatre, Newbury.

Clayton was Chairman of the Actors' Centre in Covent Garden for ten years, stepping down in January 2018 and a former member and associate artist of the National Youth Theatre. He is a regular columnist for The Stage newspaper and patron of The Hope Theatre in Islington. He is also a patron of children’s literacy charity, Grimm & Co, based in his home town of Rotherham.

Filmography

References

External links

1957 births
Living people
Male actors from Sheffield
English male stage actors
English male film actors
English male soap opera actors
National Youth Theatre members